Beatrice Nicoleta Câșlaru (also Coadă, born 20 August 1975 in Brăila) is a former medley swimmer from Romania, who competed in three consecutive  Summer Olympics for her native country, starting in 1996. At her second Olympic appearance, in Sydney, Australia, she won a silver and a bronze medal.

Nicknamed Biki, she made her international debut at the 1991 European Aquatics Championships in Athens, Greece. Just like two other swimmers from Romania, Diana Mocanu and Camelia Potec, she comes from the town of Brăila.

References

External links
  (archive)
 
 

1975 births
Living people
Romanian female medley swimmers
Swimmers at the 1992 Summer Olympics
Swimmers at the 1996 Summer Olympics
Swimmers at the 2000 Summer Olympics
Swimmers at the 2004 Summer Olympics
Olympic swimmers of Romania
Sportspeople from Brăila
Olympic silver medalists for Romania
Olympic bronze medalists for Romania
Olympic bronze medalists in swimming
Romanian female freestyle swimmers
Romanian female breaststroke swimmers
World Aquatics Championships medalists in swimming
European Aquatics Championships medalists in swimming
Medalists at the 2000 Summer Olympics
Olympic silver medalists in swimming
Universiade medalists in swimming
Universiade silver medalists for Romania
Medalists at the 1999 Summer Universiade